Bela is a genus of sea snails; marine gastropod mollusks in the family Mangeliidae.

Taxonomy
Because of taxonomic uncertainty regarding the type species, many authors in the 19th century e.g. G.O. Sars (1878) and W.H.Dall (1919) used the generic name Bela for unrelated species correctly placed in Propebela, Oenopota or Curtitoma, and then used Raphitoma for species currently placed in Bela.

Species
Species within the genus Bela (gastropod) include:

 Bela alma Thiele, 1925
 Bela ampla Smith, E.A., 1884
 † Bela ankae  Gürs, 2001 
 Bela anna Thiele, 1925
 † Bela annemariae Lozouet, 2015
 † Bela antwerpiensis  R. Marquet, 1997 
 Bela atlantidea (Knudsen, 1952)
 Bela barbiton (Melvill, J.C., 1904)
 Bela beatriceae (Mariottini, 2007)
 † Bela belgica (Van Regteren Altena, 1959) 
 Bela bella Barnard, 1958
 Bela chuni Thiele, 1925
 † Bela consimilis (Harmer, 1915) 
 Bela cycladensis (Reeve, 1845)
 Bela decussata (Locard, 1897)
 † Bela detexta (Bellardi, 1877) 
 Bela dyscrita (Watson, R.B., 1881)
 Bela erosa (Schrenck, 1861) 
 † Bela fiorentina Della Bella, Naldi & Scarponi, 2015 
 † Bela formica Nordsieck, 1977
 Bela fuscata (Deshayes, 1835)
 † Bela gervillei  (G.P. Deshayes, 1835)
 † Bela hispida (Bellardi, 1877) 
 † Bela hispidula (Bellardi, 1847) 
 † Bela keepingi  (Etheridge & Bell, 1898) 
 † Bela koeneni (Cossmann & Lambert, 1884) 
 † Bela lirifera (Bellardi, 1877) 
 Bela manolae Horro, Gori & Rolán, 2017
 † Bela megastoma (Brugnone, 1862) 
 Bela menkhorsti van Aartsen, 1988
 Bela nassoides J. Gardner, 1938
 Bela nebula (Montagu, 1803)
 † Bela nevropleura (Brugnone, 1862) 
 † Bela nitida Pavia, 1976 
 Bela nuperrima (Tiberi, 1855) 
 Bela obliquigradata  E.A. Smith, 1884
 Bela oceanica (Locard, 1897)
 † Bela odhneri Harmer, 1915 
 Bela orientalis K.H.J. Thiele, 1925
 Bela patagonica (d'Orbigny, 1841)
 † Bela plagisculpta Della Bella, Naldi & Scarponi, 2015 
 † Bela plicatella (Bellardi, 1847)
 Bela plicatilis (Risso, 1826)
 Bela powisiana (Dautzenberg, 1887)
 † Bela proxima (Cocconi, 1873) 
 † Bela pseudoappeliusi Naldi, Della Bella & Scarponi, 2013 
 † Bela pseudoexilis Della Bella, Naldi & Scarponi, 2015 
 † Bela scalariformis (Brugnone, 1862) 
 Bela schoenherri Horro, Ryall & Rolán, 2018
 † Bela seyithasanensis  B.M. Landau & al., 2013  
 Bela simplicata  É.A.A. Locard, 1896
 Bela submarginata (G. Bonelli in L.M.D. Bellardi, 1847)
 Bela taprurensis (Pallary, 1904)
 † Bela tenuistriata (A. Bell, 1871)
 † Bela trinacria Mariottini & Smriglio, 2009
 Bela turcica  K.H.J. Thiele, 1925
 Bela turgida (L.A. Reeve, 1844)
 †  Bela varovtsiana Scarponi & al., 2016 
 † Bela vulpecula (Brocchi, 1814)
 Bela zenetouae (van Aartsen, 1988)
 Bela zonata (Locard, 1892)

Species brought into synonymy 
 Bela abyssicola (Reeve, 1844): synonym of Pleurotoma abyssicola Reeve, 1844
 Bela abyssorum Locard, 1897: synonym of Gymnobela abyssorum (Locard, 1897)
 Bela aegeensis (Reeve, 1844): synonym of Bela nebula (Montagu, 1803)
 Bela africana Ardovini, 2004: synonym of Sorgenfreispira africana (Ardovini, 2004)
 Bela africana Ardovini, 2008: synonym of Sorgenfreispira africana (Ardovini, 2004)
 Bela alberti (Dautzenberg & Fisher, 1906): synonym of Phymorhynchus alberti (Dautzenberg & Fischer, 1906)
 Bela albrechti Krause, 1886: synonym of Granotoma albrechti (Krause, 1886)
 Bela aleutica (W.H. Dall, 1871): synonym of Oenopota aleutica (W.H. Dall, 1871)
 Bela americana Packard, 1867: synonym of Propebela scalaris (Møller, 1842)
 Bela anderssoni Strebel, 1908: synonym of Falsimohnia anderssoni (Strebel, 1908)
 Bela angulosa Sars G. O., 1878: synonym of Propebela angulosa (G. O. Sars, 1878)
 Bela antarctica Strebel, 1908: synonym of Conorbela antarctica (Strebel, 1908)
 Bela apollinea (Melvill, J.C., 1904): synonym of Leiocithara apollinea (Melvill, 1904)
 Bela arctica A. Adams, 1855: synonym of Propebela arctica (A. Adams, 1855)
 Bela ardovinii Mariottini & Oliverio, 2008: synonym of Sorgenfreispira ardovinii (Mariottini & Oliverio, 2008)
 Bela assimilis Sars G. O., 1878: synonym of Propebela assimilis (Sars G. O., 1878)
 Bela australis Adams & Angas, 1864: synonym of Guraleus australis (Adams & Angas, 1864)
 Bela bergensis Friele, 1886: synonym of Propebela bergensis (Friele, 1886)
 Bela bicarinata (Couthouy, 1838): synonym of Curtitoma violacea (Mighels & C. B. Adams, 1842)
 Bela blakei A. E. Verrill, 1885: synonym of Mohnia blakei (A. E. Verrill, 1885)
 Bela blaneyi Bush, 1909: synonym of Oenopota blaneyi (Bush, 1909)
 Bela brachystoma (Philippi, 1844): synonym of Sorgenfreispira brachystoma (Philippi, 1844)
 Bela cancellata Mighels & Adams, 1842 sensu G. O. Sars, 1878: synonym of Bela sarsii Verrill, 1880: synonym of Oenopota impressa (Mörch, 1869)
 Bela cancellata (Mighels & Adams, 1842): synonym of Propebela cancellata (Mighels & Adams, 1842)
 † Bela candida Yokoyama, 1926: synonym of Oenopota candida (Yokoyama, 1926)
 Bela clarae Peñas & Rolán, 2008: synonym of Bela atlantidea (Knudsen, 1952)
 Bela concinnula Verrill, 1882: synonym of Propebela concinnula (A. E. Verrill, 1882)
 Bela confusa (Locard, 1897): synonym of Bela brachystoma (Philippi, 1844)
 Bela conoidea Sars G. O., 1878: synonym of Curtitoma conoidea (Sars G. O., 1878)
 Bela costulata (Risso, 1826): synonym of Mangelia costulata Risso, 1826
 Bela decussata (Couthouy, 1839): synonym of Curtitoma decussata (Couthouy, 1839)
 Bela demersa Tiberi, 1868: synonym of Taranis moerchii (Malm, 1861)
 Bela detegata Locard, 1897: synonym of Propebela bergensis (Friele, 1886)
 Bela erythraea Jousseaume, 1895: synonym of Taranidaphne hongkongensis (Sowerby III, 1889)
 Bela eva Thiele, 1925: synonym of Maoritomella eva (Thiele, 1925)
 Bela exilis Ardovini, 2004: synonym of Sorgenfreispira exilis (Ardovini, 2004)
 Bela expansa Sars G. O., 1878: synonym of Lusitanops expansa (Sars G. O., 1878): synonym of Lusitanops expansus (Sars G. O., 1878)
 Bela exquisita Yokoyama, 1926: synonym of Curtitoma exquisita (Yokoyama, 1926)
 Bela eva Thiele, 1925: synonym of Maoritomella eva (Thiele, 1925)
 Bela excurvata Carpenter, 1864: synonym of Oenopota excurvata (Carpenter, 1864)
 Bela expansa Sars G. O., 1878: synonym of Lusitanops expansa (Sars G. O., 1878)
 Bela fidicula (Gould, 1849): synonym of Propebela fidicula (Gould, 1849)
 Bela filicinctus (E. A. Smith, 1882): synonym of Horaiclavus filicinctus (E. A. Smith, 1882)
 Bela fulvicans Strebel, 1908: synonym of Falsimohnia fulvicans (Strebel, 1908)
 Bela furfuraculata Locard, 1897: synonym of Propebela bergensis (Friele, 1886)
 Bela gazellae Strebel, 1905: synonym of Mangelia gazellae (Strebel, 1905)
 Bela ginnania (Risso, 1826): synonym of Haedropleura septangularis (Montagu, 1803)
 Bela ginnania (Risso, 1826): synonym of Haedropleura septangularis (Montagu, 1803)
 Bela glacialis Thiele, 1912: synonym of Lorabela glacialis (Thiele, 1912)
 Bela gouldii Verrill, 1882: synonym of Propebela rugulata (Reeve, 1846)
 Bela graphica Locard, 1897: synonym of Oenopota graphica (Locard, 1897)
 Bela grimaldii Dautzenberg, 1889: synonym of Amphissa acutecostata (Philippi, 1844)
 Bela grippi Dall, 1908: synonym of Bellaspira grippi (Dall, 1908)
 Bela guernei Dautzenberg, 1891: synonym of Belomitra quadruplex (Watson, 1882)
 Bela harpa Dall, 1885: synonym of Oenopota harpa (Dall, 1885)
 Bela hebes Verrill, 1880: synonym of Curtitoma hebes (Verrill, 1880)
 Bela holomera Locard, 1897: synonym of Gymnobela pyrrhogramma (Dautzenberg & Fischer, 1896)
 Bela iessoensis Smith E. A., 1875: synonym of Obesotoma iessoensis (Smith E. A., 1875)
 Bela incisula Verrill, 1882: synonym of Curtitoma incisula (Verrill, 1882)
 Bela kobelti Verkrüzen, 1876: synonym of Granotoma kobelti (Verkrüzen, 1876)
 Bela koreni Friele, 1886: synonym of Oenopota koreni (Friele, 1886)
 Bela krausei Dall, 1887: synonym of Granotoma krausei (Dall, 1887)
 Bela laevigata (Philippi, 1836): synonym of Bela zonata (Locard, 1892)
 Bela laevigata Dall, 1871: synonym of Obesotoma laevigata (Dall, 1871)
 Bela limatula Locard, 1896: synonym of Amphissa acutecostata (Philippi, 1844)
 Bela luetkeana Krause, 1885: synonym of Propebela luetkeana (Krause, 1885)
 Bela lütkeana Krause, 1885: synonym of Bela luetkeana Krause, 1885: synonym of Propebela luetkeana (Krause, 1885)
 Bela magellanica (Martens, 1881): synonym of Oenopota magellanica (Martens, 1881)
 Bela martensi Strebel, 1905: synonym of Mangelia martensi (Strebel, 1905)
 Bela metschigmensis Krause, 1886: synonym of Oenopota metschigmensis (Krause, 1886)
 Bela michaelseni Strebel, 1905: synonym of Mangelia michaelseni (Strebel, 1905)
 Bela mingoranceae Martin Perez & Vera-Pelaez, 2006: synonym of Bela powisiana (Dautzenberg, 1887)
 Bela minuscularia Locard, 1897: synonym of Curtitoma violacea (Mighels & C. B. Adams, 1842)
 Bela mitralis Adams & Angas, 1864: synonym of Guraleus mitralis (Adams & Angas, 1864)
 Bela mitrula Lovén, 1846: synonym of Propebela exarata (Møller, 1842)
 Bela murdochiana Dall, 1885: synonym of Oenopota murdochiana (Dall, 1885)
 Bela neozelanica Suter, 1908: synonym of Scrinium neozelanica (Suter, 1908)
 Bela nobilis (Møller, 1842): synonym of Propebela nobilis (Møller, 1842)
 Bela notophila Strebel, 1908: synonym of Lorabela notophila (Strebel, 1908)
 Bela obliqua Sars G. O., 1878: synonym of Oenopota obliqua (Sars G.O., 1878)
 Bela optima Thiele, 1925: synonym of Microdrillia optima (Thiele, 1925)
 Bela ornata (Locard, 1891): synonym of Mangelia costulata Risso, 1826
 † Bela paessleri H. Strebel, 1905: synonym of Mangelia paessleri (H. Strebel, 1905)
 Bela pelseneri Strebel, 1908: synonym of Lorabela pelseneri (Strebel, 1908)
 Bela plicatula Thiele, 1912: synonym of Lorabela plicatula (Thiele, 1912)
 Bela polysarca (Dautzenberg & Fischer H., 1896): synonym of Gymnobela frielei (Verrill, 1885)
 Bela purissima Strebel, 1908: synonym of Typhlodaphne purissima (Strebel, 1908)
 Bela pygmaea Verrill, 1882: synonym of Curtitoma ovalis (Friele, 1877)
 Bela pyramidalis (Ström, 1788): synonym of Oenopota pyramidalis (Strøm, 1788)
 Bela rathbuni Verrill, 1882: synonym of Propebela rathbuni (Verrill, 1882)
 Bela recondita Locard, 1897: synonym of Gymnobela pyrrhogramma (Dautzenberg & Fischer, 1896)
 Bela regina Thiele, 1925: synonym of Tomopleura regina (Thiele, 1925)
 Bela robusta Packard, 1866: synonym of Obesotoma robusta (Packard, 1866)
 Bela rugulata (Reeve, 1846): synonym of Propebela rugulata (Reeve, 1846)
 Bela sansibarica Thiele, 1925: synonym of Microdrillia sansibarica (Thiele, 1925)
 Bela sarsii Verrill, 1880: synonym of Oenopota impressa (Mörch, 1869)
 Bela scalaris (Møller, 1842): synonym of Propebela scalaris (Møller, 1842)
 Bela scalaroides Sars G. O., 1878: synonym of Propebela scalaroides (Sars G. O., 1878)
 Bela schmidti Friele, 1886: synonym of Oenopota harpa (Dall, 1885)
 Bela sculpturata Dall, 1887: synonym of Mangelia sculpturata (Dall, 1887)
 Bela septangularis (Montagu, 1803): synonym of Haedropleura septangularis (Montagu, 1803)
 Bela septenvillei (Dautzenberg & Durouchoux, 1913): synonym of Bela nebula (Montagu, 1803)
 Bela solida Dall, 1887: synonym of Obesotoma solida (Dall, 1887)
 Bela spitzbergensis Friele, 1886: synonym of Propebela spitzbergensis (Friele, 1886)
 Bela striata Hutton, 1873: synonym of †Iredalula striata (Hutton, 1873)
 Bela striatula Thiele, 1912: synonym of Belalora striatula (Thiele, 1912)
 Bela subarctica Derjugin, 1924: synonym of Propebela rugulata (Reeve, 1846)
 Bela subturgida Verrill, 1884: synonym of Propebela subturgida (Verrill, 1884)
 Bela subvitrea Verrill, 1884: synonym of Propebela subvitrea (Verrill, 1884)
 Bela tenuicostata Sars G. O., 1878: synonym of Oenopota tenuicostata (Sars G.O., 1878)
 Bela tenuilirata Dall, 1871: synonym of Obesotoma tenuilirata (Dall, 1871)
 Bela tenuilirata Krause, 1886: synonym of Curtitoma lawrenciana (Dall, 1919)
 Bela tumida Posselt, 1898: synonym of Obesotoma tumida (Posselt, 1898)
 Bela turricula (Montagu, 1803): synonym of Propebela turricula (Montagu, 1803)
 Bela turriculata Locard, 1892: synonym of Propebela turricula (Montagu, 1803)
 Bela turrita Strebel, 1908: synonym of Belaturricula turrita (Strebel, 1908)
 Bela violacea (Mighels & Adams, 1842): synonym of Curtitoma violacea (Mighels & C. B. Adams, 1842)
 Bela woodiana (Møller, 1842): synonym of Obesotoma woodiana (Møller, 1842)
 Bela yanamii Yokoyama, 1926: synonym of Plicifusus yanamii (Yokoyama, 1926)
 Bela zonatum (Locard, 1891): duplicate of Bela zonata

 Nomina dubia
 Bela fortis (Reeve, 1844): nomen dubium
 Bela minuta (Reeve, 1844): nomen dubium
 Bela turgida (Reeve, 1844): nomen dubium

References

 Vaught, K.C. (1989). A classification of the living Mollusca. American Malacologists: Melbourne, FL (USA). . XII, 195 pp
 Howson, C.M.; Picton, B.E. (Ed.) (1997). The species directory of the marine fauna and flora of the British Isles and surrounding seas. Ulster Museum Publication, 276. The Ulster Museum: Belfast, UK. . vi, 508
 Gofas, S.; Le Renard, J.; Bouchet, P. (2001). Mollusca, in: Costello, M.J. et al. (Ed.) (2001). European register of marine species: a check-list of the marine species in Europe and a bibliography of guides to their identification. Collection Patrimoines Naturels, 50: pp. 180–213
 W. Baluk. 2003. Middle Miocene (Badenian) gastropods from Korytnica, Poland; Part IV – Turridae. Acta Geological Polonica 53(1):29-78
 Mariottini P., Smriglio C., Di Giulio A. & Oliverio M. 2009. A new fossil conoidean from the Pliocene of Italy, with comments on the Bela menkhorsti complex (Gastropoda: Conidae). Journal of Conchology 40(1): 5-14

External links

 Gray J.E. (1847). On the classification of the British Mollusca by W E Leach. Annals and Magazine of Natural History. ser. 1, 20: 267-273
 P Bartsch. "The Nomenclatorial Status of Certain Northern Turritid Mollusks"; Proceedings of the biological Society of Washington 54, 1-14, 1941
  Della Bella G., Naldi F. & Scarponi D. (2015). Molluschi marini del Plio-Pleistocene dell'Emilia-Romagna e della Toscana - Superfamiglia Conoidea, vol. 4, Mangeliidae II. Lavori della Società Italiana di Malacologia. 26: 1-80
 Worldwide Mollusc Species Data Base: Mangeliidae
  Tucker, J.K. 2004 Catalog of recent and fossil turrids (Mollusca: Gastropoda). Zootaxa 682:1-1295.

 
Gastropod genera
Taxa named by John Edward Gray